The University of East Yangon, located in Thanlyin in the southeastern suburbs of Yangon, is a liberal arts and sciences university in Myanmar. The university offers bachelor's degree programs in liberal arts and science and law.

A train service opened in 2006 connects the university campus to downtown Yangon. About 2000 students use the service daily.

New Convocation Hall building is finished and had been grandly opened on 25 November 2014.

History

The University of East Yangon was founded in 2000. The move was widely believed to be part of the Burmese military government's plan to disperse university students across many universities and colleges around the country. Students who would have attended Yangon University now have to attend Dagon University or East Yangon University in Thanlyin, southeast of Yangon.

Programs
Classified as an Arts and Science university in the Burmese university education system, University of East Yangon offers bachelor's and master's degree programs in common liberal arts and sciences disciplines. Starting from 2014,  regular Bachelor of Arts (BA) and Bachelor of Science (BSc) take four years to complete and honors degree programs BA (Hons) and BSc (Hons) take five years. The regular law program also takes five years.

Administration

List of rectors
 Aung Than (Head Master Of Thanlyin College)
 Kyi Win
 Dr. Win
 Tin Maung Nyunt (Acting Rector)
 Kyaw Ye Tun
 Dr. Kyaw Kyaw Khaung
 Dr. Nay Win Oo

Associations
UTA University Teachers' Association is legally established in 2012 in accord with the Labour Law of Myanmar.

EYUSU East Yangon University Students Union is legally established in 2017 with the election of student.

References

Universities and colleges in Thanlyin
Universities and colleges in Yangon Region
Arts and Science universities in Myanmar
Universities and colleges in Myanmar